Madhura Sreedhar Reddy is an Indian film director, producer, and distributor who works in Telugu cinema. He started his film career by music label Madhura Audio and eventually turned as a director with the film Sneha Geetham in 2010.

Reddy also directed films such as It's My Love Story and Backbench Student

Background
Reddy was born and raised in Warangal. He is a B.Tech graduate from Regional Engineering College (REC, currently called as NIT Warangal). He completed his MS (Research) from IIT Madras and received Gold Medal for his excellency by Vice President of India. He worked in many multinational companies like TCS, Infosys, Wipro and Tech Mahindra.

Career
Reddy made his directorial debut with Sneha Geetham, and later directed It’s My Love Story and Backbench Student. 

His first film as producer is Maaya, directed by Neelakanta. 

Reddy went on to produce films such as Ladies & Gentlemen, Oka Manasu Designer s/o Ladies Tailor, ABCD: American Born Confused Desi and Dorasaani (2019).

Awards
Madhura Sreedhar Reddy has won Best Debutante Director for Sneha Geetham. His movie Ladies & Gentlemen won Nandi Awards for 3rd Best movie and Best Editing for the year 2015.

Filmography

References

External links
 

Year of birth missing (living people)
Living people
Film producers from Hyderabad, India
Telugu film directors
Telugu film producers
Film directors from Hyderabad, India